Kermaria-Sulard is a commune in the Côtes-d'Armor department of Brittany in northwestern France.

Population

Inhabitants of Kermaria-Sulard are called kermarianais in French.

Sister city
 Muhlbach-sur-Munster, France

See also
Communes of the Côtes-d'Armor department

References

Communes of Côtes-d'Armor